Hypopomus artedi is a species of bluntnose knifefish that is found in Argentina, Brazil, French Guiana, Guyana and Suriname.  This species can reach a length of  SL.  It can also be found in the aquarium trade.  It is the only member of its genus.

References

External links
 Photograph

Hypopomidae
Fish of South America
Fish of Brazil
Fish of Argentina
Monotypic freshwater fish genera
Taxa named by Theodore Gill